Tacumshane is a small village in the southeast of County Wexford, Ireland. It is located 15 km south of Wexford town.

Name
The official name of the village is Tacumshane. In Irish it is called Teach Coimseáin (House of Seán). The name of the village is often misspelled as "Tacumshin" as opposed to "Tacumshane". The lake and townland is spelled "Tacumshin", while the village and parish are spelled "Tacumshane". 
About two miles away is the townsland of Churchtown which was once called Tacumshane. It is where Tacumshane castle stood until it was demolished in 1984 by a local farmer. The Fence is the townsland located in the village of Tacumshane today.

Tacumshane Windmill
The windmill was built in 1846 by Nicolas Moran and was used until 1936, making it the last windmill in the Republic to work commercially. It was renovated in the 1950s. It is the oldest working windmill in Ireland. Access is managed via the nearby pub, "The Millhouse Bar".

Tacumshin Lake
Tacumshin Lake or Lough as its locally known is 1100 acres in size and is designated a Special Protection Area (SPA) by the National Parks and Wildlife Services. Closed naturally since 1972, with a barrier of dune. A tidal system know locally as "the tunnel" was constructed in the 1970s making the Lough tidal. A new system was built in the 1990s. Tachumshin Lake is a favourite with bird watchers. It attracts some rare American waders in Autumn, as well as internationally important concentrations of Bewick's swans, Brent geese, wigeon, oystercatchers, golden plover and lapwing.

Transport
Bus Éireann route 378 serves Tacumshane on Fridays only and provides a link to and from Wexford. Its terminus is at Wexford railway station.

People
 John Barry (naval officer) He is often credited as "The Father of the American Navy". Born in a rented thatched farmstead, in the then 152 acre Townland of Ballysampson, he would emigrate in the 1760s, and be appointed a Captain in the Continental Navy on 7 December 1775.
 John Meyler (born 1956 in Tacumshane, County Wexford) is an Irish hurling manager and former player. He played hurling with his local clubs Our Lady's Island and St. Finbarr's and with the Wexford and Cork senior inter-county teams from 1973 until 1987. Meyler later served as manager of Kerry, Wexford and Cork senior inter-county teams from 1990s through to today.

See also
 List of towns and villages in Ireland

References

External links
 Tacumshane in from Sanuel Lewis's 1837 Topographical Dictionary of Ireland
 History of Windmills in Wexford
 A look inside the Tacumshane Windmill on Meyler's Millhouse Bar and Restaurant website

Towns and villages in County Wexford